The Trinity Desktop Environment (TDE) is a complete software desktop environment designed for Linux and Unix-like operating systems, intended for computer users preferring a traditional desktop model, and is free/libre software. Born as a fork of KDE 3.5 back in 2010, it was originally created by Timothy Pearson, who had coordinated Kubuntu remixes featuring KDE 3.5 after Kubuntu switched to KDE Plasma 4.

TDE is now a fully independent project with its own personality and development team, available for various Linux distros, BSD and DilOS. It is currently led by Slávek Banko.

TDE releases aims to provide a stable and highly customizable desktop, continuing bug fixes, additional features, and compatibility with recent hardware. Trinity is packaged for Debian, Ubuntu, Devuan, Raspbian, Fedora, RedHat, Mageia, OpenSUSE, Slackware and various other distributions and architectures. It is also used as the default desktop environment of at least two Linux distributions, Q4OS and Exe GNU/Linux. Since version 3.5.12 (its second official release), it uses its own fork of Qt3, known as TQt3, so as to make it easier to eventually make TQt installable alongside later Qt releases.

Releases 
Early releases of Trinity used a versioning scheme based on that of K Desktop Environment 3.5, from which it was forked. The R14.0 release adopted a new versioning scheme, to prevent comparisons with KDE based on version number alone and a new visual theme. This new visual theme was based on the "KDE Lineart" background included in the wallpapers package for KDE 3.4 and covered the desktop background and was named "Trinity Lineart" along with the splash screen, "application info screens" (for some apps like Konqueror and Trinity Control Center), and banners (for some other apps like KPersonalizer and Kate). The window, widget, and icon themes were left intact, aside from replacing all KDE logos with Trinity logos.

Prior to this, Trinity kept the KDE 3.5 visual theme, but replaced the "KDE 3.5" branding with "TDE" branding, in a font that is not the "Kabel Book" font KDE used, although the K-Menu had its side image branded as just "Trinity" instead of "TDE". Kubuntu versions, on the other hand, used the included "Crystal Fire" background as the default desktop background, along with the K-Menu "side image", larger menu items, and menu layout from Kubuntu 8.04.

History

References

External links 

 
 Official Git repository

KDE
Free desktop environments